The Time Traveler's Wife is a science fiction romantic drama television series based on the 2003 novel of the same name by Audrey Niffenegger. The series was developed and written by Steven Moffat, who had previously taken inspiration from Niffenegger's novel for his work on the science fiction series Doctor Who. It was directed by David Nutter, stars Rose Leslie and Theo James, and premiered on HBO on May 15, 2022. The series received a generally negative reception, and was canceled after one season in July 2022. The fans of the show started a petition to save the series by approaching other streaming platforms to pick it up for renewal. It was removed from HBO Max in December 2022.

Blending romance and science fiction, the series follows the relationship between Henry DeTamble, a man with a genetic disorder which causes him to sporadically travel through time for short periods, and Clare Abshire, a woman who met an older version of Henry when she was a girl who told her they were married in the future. Much like the novel on which it is based, the series raises questions about determinism, free will, and identity.

Cast and characters

Main
 Rose Leslie as Clare Abshire
 Everleigh McDonell as young Clare
 Caitlin Shorey as pre-teen Clare
 Theo James as Henry DeTamble
 Jason David as young Henry
 Brian Altemus as teen Henry

Recurring
 Desmin Borges as Gomez
 Natasha Lopez as Charisse
 Michael Park as Philip Abshire
 Jaime Ray Newman as Lucille Abshire
 Taylor Richardson as Alicia Abshire
 Peter Graham as Mark Abshire
 Kate Siegel as Annette DeTamble
 Josh Stamberg as Richard DeTamble
 Chelsea Frei as Ingrid
 Marcia DeBonis as Nell
 Will Brill as Ben
 Spencer House as Jason
 Finn Brown as young Mark Abshire

Episodes

Production
On July 31, 2018, it was announced that HBO had given the production a straight-to-series order. The series is set to be written by Steven Moffat, based on the novel of the same name by Audrey Niffenegger, who is also set to executive produce alongside Sue Vertue and Brian Minchin. Production companies involved with the series include Hartswood Films and Warner Bros. Television.

In February 2021, Rose Leslie and Theo James were cast as the series leads. In April 2021, Desmin Borges and Natasha Lopez joined the main cast. Filming began on the series in May in New York and ended in October with some filming also taking place in Chicago. David Nutter has directed all six episodes. In May 2021, Caitlin Shorey, Everleigh McDonnell, Michael Park, Jaime Ray Newman, Taylor Richardson, Peter Graham, Brian Altemus, Jason David, Kate Siegel, Josh Stamberg, Chelsea Frei, Marcia DeBonis, Will Brill and Spencer House joined the cast of the series.

The series premiered on May 15, 2022 and was canceled on July 1, soon after the season finished airing.

Critical reception

 On Metacritic, the series has a score of 45 out of 100, based on 26 critic reviews, indicating "mixed or average reviews".

Anita Singh of The Daily Telegraph gave the series 2/5 stars, calling it "so lazy that episodes begin with the lead characters reading lines straight into the camera, rather than anyone making the effort to work them into the script." Brian Lowry of CNN called the series "an admirable effort, but one that simply underscores how unadaptable this material might be". Angie Han of The Hollywood Reporter criticized the setup of the romance, and added: "while things do improve from there, hollow characters, an uncertain tone and, most damningly, a total lack of chemistry keep The Time Traveler's Wife from ever quite rising to the level of swoon-worthy." Darren Franich of Entertainment Weekly gave it a D grade, saying that it had "Bad wigs, limp characterization, indifferent plotting".

Dan Einav of the Financial Times gave the series 3/5 stars, writing: "The show is buoyed by the charisma of the two lovers, and it succeeds in mining its conceit for some gentle humour and reflections on love and loss." Lucy Mangan of The Guardian also gave it 3/5 stars, saying that Moffat "takes the melodrama down a notch and salts the schmaltz with wit where he can", but criticized the nature of the romance and Clare's passivity. Nick Hilton of The Independent also gave it 3/5 stars, writing: "The Time Traveler's Wife does not have the power of the unexpected. But it has a modest, formulaic appeal that will likely keep you going back (and back) for more."

Home media 
The complete series was released on DVD, on October 18, 2022.

References

External links
 
 

2020s American drama television series
2020s American romance television series
2020s American science fiction television series
2020s British drama television series
2020s British romance television series
2020s British science fiction television series
2020s romantic drama television series
2022 American television series debuts
2022 American television series endings
2022 British television series debuts
2022 British television series endings
American romantic drama television series
British romantic drama television series
American time travel television series
British time travel television series
English-language television shows
HBO original programming
Nonlinear narrative television series
Television series by Hartswood Films
Television series by Warner Bros. Television Studios
Television series by Home Box Office
Television shows based on American novels
Television shows set in Chicago
Television shows filmed in Illinois
Television shows filmed in New York (state)